The Henry Wishard House, also known as the Fenton House, is a historic residence located in Bloomfield, Iowa, United States.  Wishard was a prominent Bloomfield businessman, who was known as the father of the gasoline tax in the United States to raise revenue for road construction.  He also built more than 100 buildings in Bloomfield and Dighton, Kansas.  Wishard had this two-story brick house built in the Queen Anne style in 1910.  The property also included a barn, a chicken house and another small out-building.  The barn was replaced with a garage that complements the house, and the other two structures have subsequently been removed.  The house was listed on the National Register of Historic Places in 2004.

References

Houses completed in 1910
Queen Anne architecture in Iowa
Bloomfield, Iowa
Houses in Davis County, Iowa
National Register of Historic Places in Davis County, Iowa
Houses on the National Register of Historic Places in Iowa